The Ukraine national under-16 football team is controlled by the Football Federation of Ukraine.

History 
The team participated in tournaments like the Aegean Cup since its formation after the dissolution of the Soviet Union.

Current squad 
As of 30 January 2006

Managers 
 Yuriy Kalitvintsev

See also 
 Ukraine national football team
 Ukraine national under-21 football team

References 
http://ukrainiansoccer.net/news/news_article.asp?ID=22239

European national under-16 association football teams
under-16
Youth football in Ukraine